In mathematics, a positive (or signed) measure μ defined on a σ-algebra Σ of subsets of a set X is called a finite measure if μ(X) is a finite real number (rather than ∞), and a set A in Σ is of finite measure if μ(A) < ∞. The measure μ is called σ-finite if X is a countable union of measurable sets with finite measure.  A set in a measure space is said to have σ-finite measure if it is a countable union of measurable sets with finite measure. A measure being σ-finite is a weaker condition than being finite, i.e. all finite measures are σ-finite but there are (many) σ-finite measures that are not finite.

A different but related notion that should not be confused with σ-finiteness is s-finiteness.

Definition 
Let  be a measurable space and  a measure on it.

The measure  is called a  σ-finite measure, if it satisfies one of the four following equivalent criteria:
 the set  can be covered with at most countably many measurable sets with finite measure.
 the set  can be covered with at most countably many measurable disjoint sets with finite measure.
 the set  can be covered with a monotone sequence of measurable sets with finite measure.
 there exists a strictly positive measurable function  whose integral is finite.

If  is a -finite measure, the measure space  is called a -finite measure space.

Examples

Lebesgue measure

For example, Lebesgue measure on the real numbers is not finite, but it is σ-finite.  Indeed, consider the intervals  for all integers ; there are countably many such intervals, each has measure 1, and their union is the entire real line.

Counting measure

Alternatively, consider the real numbers with the counting measure; the measure of any finite set is the number of elements in the set, and the measure of any infinite set is infinity. This measure is not σ-finite, because every set with finite measure contains only finitely many points, and it would take uncountably many such sets to cover the entire real line. But, the set of natural numbers  with the counting measure is σ -finite.

Locally compact groups

Locally compact groups which are σ-compact are σ-finite under the Haar measure. For example, all connected, locally compact groups G are σ-compact. To see this,  let V be a relatively compact, symmetric (that is V = V−1) open neighborhood of the identity. Then

is an open subgroup of G. Therefore H is also closed since its complement is a union of open sets and by connectivity of G, must be G itself. Thus all connected Lie groups are σ-finite under Haar measure.

Nonexamples

Incidentally, both are translation-invariant.

Properties

The class of σ-finite measures has some very convenient properties;  σ-finiteness can be compared in this respect to separability of topological spaces. Some theorems in analysis require σ-finiteness as a hypothesis. Usually, both the Radon–Nikodym theorem and Fubini's theorem are stated under an assumption of σ-finiteness on the measures involved. However, as shown in Segal's paper "Equivalences of measure spaces" (Am. J. Math. 73, 275 (1953)) they require only a weaker condition, namely localisability.

Though measures which are not σ-finite are sometimes regarded as pathological, they do in fact occur quite naturally.  For instance, if X is a metric space of Hausdorff dimension r, then all lower-dimensional Hausdorff measures are non-σ-finite if considered as measures on X.

Equivalence to a probability measure 

Any σ-finite measure μ on a space X is equivalent to a probability measure on X: let Vn, n ∈ N, be a covering of X by pairwise disjoint measurable sets of finite μ-measure, and let wn, n ∈ N, be a sequence of positive numbers (weights) such that

The measure ν defined by

is then a probability measure on X with precisely the same null sets as μ.

Related concepts

Moderate measures 

Every moderate measure is a -finite measure, the converse is not true.

Decomposable measures 
Note that for decomposable measures, there is no restriction on the number of measurable sets with finite measure.

Every -finite measure is a decomposable measure, the converse is not true.

s-finite measures 
A measure  is called a s-finite measure if it is the sum of at most countably many finite measures.

Every σ-finite measure is s-finite, the converse is not true. For a proof and counterexample see s-finite measure#Relation to σ-finite measures.

See also
 Sigma additivity

References 

Measures (measure theory)